was a Japanese actor and voice actor. He began acting in the theatre company Bungakuza and later co-founded Gekidan Kumo (劇団雲 "Cloud Theatre Company") in 1963. Nishimoto then joined Theatre Company Subaru in 1976. He provided the voice of Snufkin in the television adaptions of Moomin, a book series and comic strip by Tove Jansson. Nishimoto was also known for dubbing the Japanese language versions of many Disney films. He died of an aortic dissection in 2015, aged 88.

Partial filmography
The Woman in the Dunes (1964)
Goke, Body Snatcher from Hell (1968)
The Beast to Die (1974)
Television
Moomin
 Mito Kōmon
The Return of Ultraman
Taiyō ni Hoero!
Kamen Rider
Space Sheriff Gavan
Kamen Rider Black RX
New Moomin

References

External links
 
 

1927 births
2015 deaths
Male actors from Tokyo
Deaths from aortic dissection
20th-century Japanese male actors
21st-century Japanese male actors
Japanese male stage actors
Japanese male television actors
Japanese male voice actors